Lake Sevan is the largest body of water in both Armenia and the Caucasus region. It is one of the largest freshwater high-altitude (alpine) lakes in Eurasia. It is fed by 28 rivers and streams. Only 10% of the incoming water is drained by the Hrazdan River, while the remaining 90% evaporates.

The lake provides some 90% of the fish and 80% of the crayfish catch of Armenia. Sevan has significant economic, cultural, and recreational value. Its sole major island (now a peninsula) is home to a medieval monastery.

Sevan was heavily exploited for irrigation of the Ararat plain and hydroelectric power generation during the Soviet period. Later two tunnels were built to divert water from highland rivers, which halted its decline and its level began rising.

Etymology 
Scholars believe that Sevan originated from the Urartian word su(i)n(i)a, usually translated as "lake". The word is found on an 8th-century BC cuneiform inscription by the Urartian king Rusa I, found in Odzaberd, on the southern shore of the lake. Per folk etymology, Sevan is either a combination of sev ("black") + Van (i.e., Lake Van) or sev ("black") and vank’ ("monastery"). Russian and European sources of the 19th and early 20th century sometimes referred to the lake as Sevanga or Sevang, which are likely the Russified version of the Armenian phrase sev vank’ ("black monastery") or, possibly, the Armenian phrase սա է վանքը sa ē vank'ə ("this is the monastery").

The historical Armenian name of the lake, attested in early medieval texts, is Sea of Gegham (classical Armenian: ծով Գեղամայ, tsov Geghamay). In classical antiquity, the lake was known as Lychnitis. The historic Georgian name of the lake is Gelakuni (გელაქუნი), which is essentially the Georgian transcription of Armenian Gegkarkuni. John Chardin, who visited the lake in 1673, called it the "Lake of Erivan" and wrote that it was called Deria-Shirin (the Sweet Lake) by Persians and Kiagar-couni-sou by Armenians.

The Turkic name Gokcha or Gökche, which means "blue lake' appeared in Russian and British sources from the 19th century on.

Significance

Cultural 
Along with Lake Van and Lake Urmia, Sevan is considered one of the three great "seas" of historic Armenia. It is the only one within the boundaries of present-day Republic of Armenia, while the other two are located in Turkey and Iran, respectively. Lake Sevan is considered the "jewel" of Armenia and is "recognized as a national treasure" in the country. The 2001 Law on Lake Sevan defines the lake as "a strategic ecosystem valuable for its environmental, economical, social, scientific, cultural, aesthetic, medical, climatic, recreational, and spiritual value."

Chardin in 1673 noted the "extraordinary sweetness of the Water", the "small Island in the middle of it; where stands a Monastery built about 600 years ago, of which the Prior is an Archbishop", and "nine sorts of fish which are there taken; the fairest trouts and carps which are eaten at Erivan being caught in this Lake".

Naturalist and traveler Friedrich Parrot, best known for ascending Mount Ararat in 1829 for the first time in history, wrote that,

Economic 
It is important for the Armenian economy: being the main source of irrigation water, Sevan provides low-cost electricity, fish, recreation, and tourism.

Origin 
Sevan originated during the early Quaternary when a Palaeo-Sevan, ten times larger than the present lake, came into existence by tectonic formation. The current lake was formed some 25 to 30 thousand years ago.

Human intervention

Exploitation and reduction

Background 
Sevan was recognized as being a major potential water resource in the 19th century. Its high altitude location relative to the fertile Ararat plain and limited energy resources attracted engineers to explore ways of usage of the lake's water. In his 1910 book, Armenian engineer Sukias Manasserian proposed using Sevan's water for irrigation and hydroelectric power generation.

Implementation 
Manasserian's proposal was adopted by the Soviet authorities in the 1930s when, under Joseph Stalin, the country was undergoing rapid industrialization. Works on the project started in 1933. The riverbed of Hrazdan was deepened through excavation. A tunnel was bored around  under the lake's surface. The water was used for irrigation and the Sevan–Hrazdan Cascade of six hydroelectric power stations on Hrazdan River.

Effects 
During the second half of the 20th century, the ecological condition of Lake Sevan underwent tangible changes and vast degradation due to reduced water level, increased eutrophication, and detrimental impact of human activity on the biological diversity of the lake. Due to the water level decrease, the quality of the water deteriorated, natural habitats were destroyed that meant loss of biodiversity. Vardanian wrote that drop of the lake level and the economic development in the basin brought about the change in hydro-chemical regime of the lake. The quality of the water deteriorated, water turbidity increased. The inner circulation of the water constituents as well as the circulation of the biological substances altered.

Reversal and recovery 
According to Babayan et al. "by the 1950s it had become evident that the ecological and economic consequences of extensive exploitation of the water of Lake Sevan were too undesirable to continue in the same way."

Arpa–Sevan tunnel 
The tunnel, called Arpa–Sevan, was completed in 1981.

It is estimated, that due to climate change by year 2030, the outflow of the Arpa river will decrease by 22%.

Vorotan–Arpa tunnel 
Since the water level in the lake did not rise as fast and as much, on 20 April 1981 the Council of Ministers of the Soviet Union made a decision for the construction of the Vorotan–Arpa tunnel. Due to the Nagorno-Karabakh conflict and the 1988 earthquake in northwestern Armenia construction was halted. The tunnel was inaugurated on 26 April 2004. The Vorotan–Arpa tunnel brings an additional  to the lake annually.

Increase in water level 
After the construction of the two tunnels the water level began rising significantly since the mid-2000s. It reached  in October 2010. The government committee on Sevan forecasts that the level will reach  by 2029.

Water level stood at 1900.44 m in November 2019.

Population 

The Gegharkunik Province, which roughly corresponds to the lake's basin, had a de facto population of 211,828 according to the 2011 Armenian census. The largest settlements in the province are: Gavar (20,765), Sevan (19,229), Martuni (12,894), Vardenis (12,685), Vardenik (9,880), Yeranos (6,119), Chambarak (5,660), Lchashen (5,054), Tsovagyugh (4,189).

Tourism

Beaches 
Lake Sevan has the only beaches in Armenia. They are a popular destination for the Armenians. Sevan's beaches provide a unique experience within the landlocked country for Armenians. The beaches adjacent to hotels are usually privatized. Numerous beaches are located along the entire lake shore. The most popular of them is a  stretch on the northern shore, extending northwest from the peninsula.  Resorts include Harsnaqar Hotel, Best Western Bohemian Resort, and numerous smaller facilities. Activities include swimming, sunbathing, jet skiing, windsurfing, and sailing. The area also includes numerous campgrounds and picnic areas for daytime use. A less-developed beach destination stretches along the eastern shore from Tsovagyugh to Shorzha, with numerous small cabins at Shorzha. The Avan Marak Tsapatagh Hotel, a Tufenkian Heritage Hotel, is a luxury resort on the undeveloped southeastern shore of the lake near Tsapatagh.

The Armenian government pledged to "reduce the growing commercialization of rest at Lake Sevan that makes it unaffordable for most citizens struggling to find other beach options during hot Armenian summers." In 2011 the government established public beaches in the Sevan National Park's recreational zone. The first two public beaches were opened in July. Some 100,000 people visited the public beaches in summer of 2011. The beaches have free parking space, children's and sports playgrounds, toilets, medical aid stations, and rescue services. They are also equipped with beach couches. By 2014, the number of public beaches reached 11. Some 200,000 people took holiday there in 2014.

Sites of interest 
The most famous cultural monument is the Sevanavank monastery located on the peninsula, which was until the mid-20th century an island. Another prominent monastery at the western shore is Hayravank, and further south, in the village of Noratus, is a field of khachkars; a cemetery with about 900 khachkars of different styles. Additional khachkars are found at Nerkin Getashen on the south coast.

In 2017, a Wikipedia globe was submerged in the lake to create an artificial reef.

Island

Fauna

Fish 
Sevan trout (Salmo ischchan) is an endemic species of the lake, but it is endangered as some competitors were introduced into the lake, including common whitefish (Coregonus lavaretus) from Lake Ladoga, goldfish (Carrasius auratus), and crayfish (Astacus leptodactylus). If the Sevan trout is likely to become extinct in its "home" lake, it seems that it will survive in Issyk-Kul Lake (Kyrgyzstan), where it was introduced in the 1970s.

Due to anthropogenic impact, changes have occurred in all the biological components of the lake, including bacteria, benthos, and of course fish. Thus, the benthic mass increased tenfold in 1940, due to oligochaetes and chrinomices. Today, the former prevail and multiply the oxygen-rich residue at the bottom of the lake.

The bojak and winter bakhtak species of the Sevan-endemic trout have already disappeared. The summer bakhtak occurs rarely; the gegharkuni is still capable of reproducing naturally. In 1980s, the quantity of Sevan koghak significantly decreased. Numerous reasons for this have been identified:
 The level of the water was lowered, the paths of rivers changed, and the trout (gegharkuni and Aestivalis species) lost their natural spаwning places. Changes in the areas near the shore (mossing, disappearance of macrophyte plants) also had a negative impact on the trout lays.
 Deoxidization of the bottom is extremely detrimental for salmon, which are used to more than 4 mg/L of O2.
 In the last 10 years, poaching rapidly increased, which significantly reduced the number of fish in the lake.

Birds 
The bird fauna of the lake and its vicinity makes over 200 species, out of which 95 species are breeding. The lake is an important breeding ground for the Armenian gull (Larus armenicus) with about 4,000–5,000 pairs. During migration the Lake is visited by wide variety of birds including raptors, such as Montagu's harrier (Circus pygargus) and Steppe eagle (Aquila nipalensis), waterbirds such as red-crested pochard (Netta rufina) and ferruginous duck (Aythya nyroca), while during the wintering period the lake hosts another set of species such as Bewick's swan (Cygnus columbianus) and great black-headed gull (Larus ichthyaetus). Sometimes the lake is visited by very rare Armenian migrant lesser white-fronted goose (Anser erythropus).

Pollution 
The rivers feeding Lake Sevan flow through densely populated settlements which produce agricultural, domestic, and industrial waste. It significantly changes the lake's ecosystem. According to a 2017 study the lake's water contains concentration of metals such as aluminium, nickel, arsenic, cobalt, and lead.

According to Armenian environmental organization EcoLur, the lake is in a critical condition because of the presence of vanadium. Environmental Impact Monitoring Center, an agency of the Armenian Ministry of Nature Protection, reported in 2012 that the average annual concentration of vanadium (64 μg/L) in the samples taken from Lake Sevan exceeded the maximum permissible concentration (MPC) by 6.4 times, while selenium (26 μg/L) exceeded MPC 2.6 times, copper (21 μg/L) 2.1 times, magnesium (60 μg/L) 1.2 times. A 2016 study found that mining and metallurgical industrial activities—namely the Sotk gold mine on the southeastern shore of the lake—caused significant heavy metal, especially vanadium, pollution of the Sotk and Masrik rivers in the Lake Sevan catchment basin. According to the researchers it "may have posed health risks to aquatic life as well as to humans (at least in the case of river water used for drinking purposes)."

References 
Notes

Citations

Bibliography 
 
 
 
 

Geography of Gegharkunik Province
Lakes of Armenia
Mountain lakes
Ramsar sites in Armenia
Tourist attractions in Gegharkunik Province